The Deed Is Done is the sixth studio album by American rock band Molly Hatchet. It was released in 1984 through Epic Records. This is the first Molly Hatchet album with only two guitarists, after Steve Holland had been replaced by ex-Danny Joe Brown Band keyboard player John Galvin and the return of drummer Bruce Crump. It was also the band's last album for 21 years to feature longtime guitarist Dave Hlubek. The sound of the album is quite different from the southern rock of the band's earlier offerings, completing the transition towards more commercial and FM-friendly hard rock. The Deed Is Done is also Molly Hatchet's last studio album released on Epic Records, and their last one to date to enter the Billboard charts. It was reissued in 2013 under the German label SPV/SteamHammer.

Track listing
Side one
"Satisfied Man" (Thomas DeLuca, Tom Jans) - 5:01
"Backstabber" (Ronald Brooks, DeLuca, Jeff Ross) - 4:17
"She Does She Does" (Danny Joe Brown, Bruce Crump, John Galvin, Dave Hlubek, Duane Roland, Riff West) - 6:14
"Intro Piece" (Galvin) - 1:16
"Stone in Your Heart" (Brooks, DeLuca, Harold Tipton) - 4:17

Side two
"Man on the Run" (Jack Armstrong, DeLuca, Gary Harrison, Terry Manning, Roland) - 4:14
"Good Smoke and Whiskey" (Brown, Crump, DeLuca, Galvin, Hlubek, Roland, West) - 3:37
"Heartbreak Radio" (Frankie Miller, Troy Seals) - 3:31
"I Ain't Got You" (Calvin Carter) - 2:32
"Straight Shooter" (Brown, Crump, Galvin, Hlubek, Roland, West) - 3:54
"Song for the Children" (Hlubek) - 2:33

Personnel
Molly Hatchet
Danny Joe Brown - vocals
Dave Hlubek - guitar
Duane Roland - guitar
John Galvin - keyboards
Riff West - bass
Bruce Crump - drums

Additional musicians
Jimi Jamison, Tom DeLuca, Steve Bassett, Terry Manning - background vocals
Jim Horn - saxophone

Production
Terry Manning - producer, engineer, mixing
Andy de Ganahl, Dana Cornock - assistant engineers
Bob Ludwig - mastering at Masterdisk, New York
Ezra Tucker - cover art

Charts

Album

Singles

References

Molly Hatchet albums
1984 albums
Epic Records albums